Callum MacDonald (born 31 May 1983 in Perth) is a Scottish footballer who last played as a defender for Edusport.

During his career, MacDonald has played for Dundee, Peterhead and Montrose.

External links
 (missing games from 07/08 and only until 2009)
 (his missing stats from Peterhead and current season)

1983 births
Living people
Footballers from Perth, Scotland
Association football defenders
Scottish footballers
Scottish Football League players
Dundee F.C. players
Peterhead F.C. players
University of Stirling F.C. players
Clachnacuddin F.C. players
Montrose F.C. players
Caledonian Braves F.C. players
Lowland Football League players
Scottish Professional Football League players
Scottish Junior Football Association players